Sokhuldzhan is a village in the Yardymli Rayon of Azerbaijan.

References 

Populated places in Yardimli District